Kamb Glacier is a broad elevated glacier) long, in the Royal Society Range, Victoria Land, Antarctica, flowing northeast from Fogle Peak to enter Condit Glacier. It was named in 1992 by the Advisory Committee on Antarctic Names after glaciologist Barclay Kamb of the California Institute of Technology, who was from the 1980s a principal investigator in United States Antarctic Research Program studies of the West Antarctic Ice Sheet, including the drilling of deep boreholes to the base of Siple Coast ice streams, and who undertook research in order to determine the mechanisms by which the ice streams are able to move at relatively greater speeds than the surrounding ice sheet.

References

Glaciers of Victoria Land
Scott Coast